This is a list of defunct airlines of Equatorial Guinea.

See also

 List of airlines of Equatorial Guinea
 List of airports in Equatorial Guinea

References

Equatorial Guinea
Airlines
Airlines, defunct
Airlines